Tall Naqareh or Tol-e Noqareh may refer to:
 Tall Naqareh, Kazerun
 Tall Naqareh, Mamasani
 Tol-e Noqareh, Mahvarmilani, Mamasani County